The 1998 FAI 1000 Classic was the second running of the Australia 1000 race, first held after the organisational split over the Bathurst 1000 the previous year. It was the 41st race that traces its lineage back to the 1960 Armstrong 500 held at Phillip Island. 1998 was the 36th year in which a touring car endurance race had been held at the Mount Panorama Circuit.

The event, which was contested by V8 Supercars, was held on 15 November 1998 at the Mount Panorama Circuit just outside Bathurst.

Entry list

Results

Top 10 shootout

* Mark Skaife became the first driver to lap a touring car around the 6.213 km (3.861 mi) Mount Panorama Circuit in under 2 minutes and 10 seconds. Skaife qualified his Holden Racing Team VT Commodore in 2:09.8945. His time was 2.93 seconds faster than his own time set in the twin-turbo, 4WD Nissan Skyline R32 GT-R in 1991, the fastest Group A time on The Mountain, and 3.96 seconds faster than George Fury's, Group C time in 1984 in a Nissan Bluebird Turbo on the old 6.172 km (3.835 mi) (pre-Caltex Chase) circuit.* Greg Murphy did not take part in the Top 10 shootout after badly damaging his car in a crash during Friday practice.

Race

References

Statistics
 Provisional position - #5 Glenn Seton - 2:11.4634
 Pole position - #1 Mark Skaife - 2:09.8945
 Fastest lap - #1 Craig Lowndes - 2:12.7771
 Average speed - 149 km/h

External links
 Official race results
 Official V8 Supercar website
 CAMS Manual reference to Australian titles
 race results
 1998 FAI 1000 Classic and 1998 AMP Bathurst 1000 images

Motorsport in Bathurst, New South Wales
FAI 1000